The Leon County paleontological sites are assemblages of Early Miocene invertebrates and vertebrates of Leon County, Florida, United States.

Age
Era: Neogene.
Period: Early Miocene. 
Geological Formation: Torreya Formation.

Sites
Leon County paleontological sites are represented by the following:
Griscom Plantation Site. Located in Killearn Lakes Plantation, south-southeast of Lake Iamonia on the southeast most section of Luna Plantation during a well drilling operation. Time period: ~23.6–18.8 Ma. (AEO).
Coordinates: 
Seaboard Air Line Railroad Site. Location was south of the center of Tallahassee during a dredging operation for a roadway.  Time period: ~21.7 Ma. (AEO, Alroy).
Coordinates: 
St. Marks River site. Located along the St. Marks River in southern Leon County. Time period: ~23.1–21.9 Ma. (AEO, Alroy).
Coordinates: 
Tallahassee Waterworks Sites. Locations were just south of the center of Tallahassee. Time period: ~23.03–15.99 Ma.
Coordinates: 
USGS 2302 
USGS 3423 aka J.C. Henderson's well  
USGS 395
Griscom Plantation Site = GPS. Seaboard Air Line Railroad = SALR. St. Marks River site = SMRS. Tallahassee Waterworks Site = TWWS.

Specimens

Invertebrates
Anomia suwaneensis (bivalve) TWWS 3424
Chlamys (scallop) TWWS 2302
Ostrea normalis (oyster) SALR
Lucina janus (bivalve) TWWS 2302
Mercenaria langdoni TWWS 395	
Metis chipolana (bivalve) TWWS 2302
Turritella alcida (seal snail) TWWS 2302

Fish
Carcharhinidae (requiem shark) SALR
Myliobatidae (eagle ray) SALR
Pristis (sawfish) SALR
Sciaenidae (croaker) SALR

Reptiles
Alligatoridae (alligator) SALR 
Boidae (boa or constricting snake) SALR
Crocodylidae (crocodile) SALR
Emydidae (pond turtle) SALR 
Testudinidae (land tortoise) SALR

Birds
Gruidae (crane) SALR
Ciconiidae (stork) SALR

Mammals
Anchitherium clarencei (horse) SALR
Aphelops (rhinoceros) SALR
Archaeohippus blackbergi (horse) SALR
Camelidae (family of camel) GPS 
Floridatragulus (camel) SALR
Menoceras (rhinoceros) SALR
Moropus SMRS
Osbornodon iamonensis (proto-dog) GPS
Oxydactylus (camel)
Parahippus (horse) SALR
Parahippus leonensis (horse) GPS, SALR
Prosynthetoceras texanus (deer-like ungulate) SALR
Nothokemas floridanus (camel) SALR
Proheteromys floridanus (rodent) SALR
Ruminantia (unknown ruminant) GPS

References

E. H. Sellards. 1916. Fossil vertebrates from Florida: A new Miocene fauna; new Pliocene species; the Pleistocene fauna. Florida State Geological Survey Annual Report 8:79–119.
S. J. Olsen. 1964. The stratigraphic importance of a Lower Miocene vertebrate fauna from north Florida. Journal of Paleontology 38(3):477–482. Collected by S. J. Olsen, R. Cantwell, C. Cox.
J. R. Gardner. 1947. The Molluscan Fauna of the Alum Bluff Group of Florida. United States Geological Survey Professional Paper (142A-H)1–709.

Paleontological sites of Florida
Geography of Leon County, Florida
Cenozoic paleontological sites of North America
Miocene paleontological sites